FC UNA Strassen is a football club, based in Strassen, Luxembourg.

History
The club was founded in 1922 as Union Athlétique Strassen.

Current squad
As of 5 February, 2023.

External links
  FC UNA Strassen official website

UNA Strassen
UNA Strassen
1922 establishments in Luxembourg